Edward Joyce (born 1908) was an English professional footballer who played as an outside right.

Career
Born in Bradford, Joyce signed for Bradford City in August 1929 from Yorkshire Amateur, leaving the club in 1930. During his time with Bradford City he made one appearance in the Football League.

Sources

References

1908 births
Date of death missing
English footballers
Yorkshire Amateur A.F.C. players
Bradford City A.F.C. players
English Football League players
Association football outside forwards